Kalu Kalan is a village in Hazro Tehsil of Attock District in Punjab, Pakistan. Kalu Kalan is situated in the west of Chhachh Valley about 2 km from Hazro city.

The population consists of Muslims and local languages are Hindko and Pashto.

References

Villages in Attock District